Su-27 Flanker is a combat flight simulator released for the PC (DOS and Microsoft Windows) in 1995 on CD. Developed in Russia by Eagle Dynamics and published by Strategic Simulations, Inc (SSI), the game takes part in Crimea and allows players to fly the Sukhoi Su-27 in various combat roles. The game also includes a mission editor, allowing the player to create custom gameplay scenarios.

The Windows 95 version was released first, with the DOS version being developed later.

Version history
 Su-27 Flanker: released 1995
 Su-27 Flanker Mission Disk: released 1997
 Su-27 Flanker: Squadron Commander's Edition: released 1997, compilation that includes the main game and expansion

Reception

Reviewing the Windows 95 version, a Next Generation critic summarized the game as being "designed for realism over ease of use." He noted that the notations in the cockpit are in Russian, and that the game has no introduction of any sort when it boots up, instead simply presenting a long list of files with undescriptive names, leaving the player with no idea of where to start. He concluded that serious flight sim enthusiasts should consider getting the game for its "unsurpassed" realistic modeling of the Su-27, but that anyone else would be completely lost. He scored it two out of five stars.

Su-27 Flanker was a runner-up for Computer Gaming Worlds 1995 "Simulation of the Year" award, which ultimately went to EF2000. The editors wrote that Su-27 Flanker features "an astonishing variety of allies and targets in the air and on the ground, as well as extremely challenging computer pilot AI."

Sequels 

 Flanker 2.0: is a direct sequel to Su-27 Flanker.
 Lock On: Modern Air Combat is a continuation of the Flanker series.
 Digital Combat Simulator includes Su-27, Su-33 and J-11 simulations descended from the Flanker and Lock On versions.

References

External links

 Eagle Dynamics
 Gamespot.com's review of Su-27 Flanker

1995 video games
Combat flight simulators
DOS games
Strategic Simulations games
Video games developed in Russia
Video games with expansion packs
Windows games
Works set in Crimea